Kirkburton railway station served the village of Kirkburton, West Yorkshire, England until closure in 1930.

History
It was unusual in that it was built by the London and North Western Railway in an area where the Lancashire and Yorkshire Railway had a virtual monopoly. Plans to extend the line to  never materialised and so Kirkburton remained at the end of the line. It was primarily used for the transportation of goods, although passenger services ran until the station closed on 28 July 1930. These terminated shortly after the LMS had gained a half share in Huddersfield Corporation bus operations. The line continued to be used to transport goods until 1965, when a combination of road haulage and a decline in industry lead to closure. A one-mile stub off the main line at  remained to serve the ICI works until February 1971.

The bulk of the station site is now occupied by a housing development along North Wood Park, which follows the old track bed. A retaining wall and arch remain at the junction of North Wood Park and North Road (B6116).

Route

References

Disused railway stations in Kirklees
Former London and North Western Railway stations
Railway stations in Great Britain opened in 1867
Railway stations in Great Britain closed in 1930
Kirkburton